Francis Drake   was an English politician who sat in the House of Commons from 1654 to 1659.

Drake was the son of Francis Drake of Esher, Surrey. He was probably admitted at Emmanuel College, Cambridge on 17 March 1627 and was awarded BA in 1631 and MA in 1634.  In 1654, he was elected Member of Parliament for Surrey in the First Protectorate Parliament. He was re-elected MP for Surrey in 1656 for the Second Protectorate Parliament and in 1659 for the Third Protectorate Parliament.

References

Year of birth missing
Year of death missing
People from Surrey
Alumni of Emmanuel College, Cambridge
Place of birth missing
English MPs 1654–1655
English MPs 1656–1658
English MPs 1659